Heteromyias is a genus of passerine birds in the Australasian robin family Petroicidae.

The genus was introduced by the English zoologist Richard Bowdler Sharpe in 1879 with the grey-headed robin (Heteromyias cinereifrons) as the type species. The name of the genus combines the Ancient Greek  "different" and the Modern Latin  "flycatcher".

Species
The genus contains three species:

References

External links

 
Taxonomy articles created by Polbot